The 1995 Nordic Figure Skating Championships were held from February 17th through 19th, 1995 in Enköping, Sweden. The competition was open to elite figure skaters from Nordic countries. Skaters competed in two disciplines, men's singles and ladies' singles, across two levels: senior (Olympic-level) and junior.

Senior results

Men

Ladies

Junior results

Men

Ladies

References

Nordic Figure Skating Championships, 1995
Nordic Figure Skating Championships, 1995
Nordic Figure Skating Championships
International figure skating competitions hosted by Sweden
Sport in Uppsala County